May Stars is a 1959 Soviet-Czechoslovak war film directed by Stanislav Rostotsky.

Plot 
The film takes place in May 1945. Soviet soldiers liberate Prague. People remember life before the war, they gladly meet their loved ones and swear to preserve peace and quiet on Earth forever.

Cast 
 Aleksandr Khanov as Generál
 Míša Staninec as Dušan
 Jana Dítětová as Matka
 Ladislav Pešek as Řídící učitel
 Jana Brejchová as Učitelka Jana
 Vyacheslav Tikhonov as Por. Rukavickin
 Mikhail Pugovkin as Staršina
 Miloš Nedbal as Novák

References

External links 
 

1959 films
1950s war drama films
1950s Russian-language films
1950s Czech-language films
Czechoslovak drama films
Soviet black-and-white films
Czechoslovak black-and-white films
Soviet war drama films
Soviet multilingual films
Czechoslovak multilingual films
1959 drama films
1950s multilingual films
Czech World War II films
Soviet World War II films
Czechoslovak World War II films
Russian World War II films
Czech propaganda films